Pyrrhiades is a genus of butterflies in the family Hesperiidae. It contains only one species, Pyrrhiades lucagus, the western blue policeman, which is found in Liberia, Ivory Coast and Ghana. The habitat consists of coastal forests.

Adults are attracted to flowers, bird droppings and mud patches.

The larvae feed on Acridocarpus smeathmanni.

References

External links
Natural History Museum Lepidoptera genus database

Coeliadinae
Monotypic butterfly genera
Hesperiidae genera